The Wilhelm and William Lampe Ranch in Gardnerville, Nevada was listed on the National Register of Historic Places in 2018.

It has also been known as Jacobs Family Berry Farm.

It was a  ranch in 1928.

The Lampe Ranch House, on the ranch, is a "subdued example" of Gothic Revival architecture.

Wilhelm Lampe was born in 1858 in Hanover, Germany.

References

		
National Register of Historic Places in Douglas County, Nevada